is a famous J-pop duo from Japan who debuted in 2006 under Victor Entertainment. The group is founded by both Rena Shimura and Haruka. Later on, two new members, Miki and Kei, joined the band in 2007. Today, Miki and Kei were the active members of the band after Rena and Haruka left to become actresses.

History
In June 2006, Kewpie was looking for a duet of two girls to perform the song "Tarako Tarako Tarako" for its Tarako Pasta Sauce commercial. Auditions were held, and the parts were given to Rena Shimura and Haruka. The band was named after the Japanese art of cosplay, and was named with the theory that the costumes could easily change with the concept of the song.

The band's first single, "Tarako Tarako Tarako", hit the top ten of the Oricon singles list. At the age of 10½ years, Haruka was the youngest person in history to reach that high on the charts. Later that Christmas, a special version of the song, entitled "Tarako Tarako Tarako Christmas", was released as a special DVD.

After releasing one more song (Kurutto Mawatte Ikkaiten/Danshingu Shisutā), Haruka left the band. She officially left the band on June 30, 2007.

Rena remained in the band, but on July 13, 2007, a temporary band consisting of Rena and Michiko Shimizu, KIGURUMICHIKO, formed to perform the song "Hottottotto na Mainichi", which was used as the 5th anniversary ending for the show "Atashin'chi".

On September 7, 2007, Kigurumi was asked to perform the song "Tamagotchi" for the upcoming movie "Tamagotchi: The Movie", but the song required a trio. Auditions were held, and on November 7, 2007, two new members, Miki and Kei, joined the band. Together, they released the album "Tamagotchi". The band also sang the end song for the film, "Chiisana Hoshi No Youni".

On April 25, 2008, Rena left the band. Miki and Kei still continue to produce songs in the band.

Discography

Albums
Kigurumi (キグルミ) (2007)
Kigurumi no Kodomo no Uta (キグルミのこどものうた) (2008)
Kigarumi tamagotchi

Download
Minna de! Sansū 99-tai (みんなで！　さんすう　９９隊) (2007)
Tamagotchi (Rena Version) 1-ban (たまごっち（レナヴァージョン）1番) (2007)
Winter Wonderland (2008)

DVD
Tarako Tarako Tarako Tappuri Christmas Box (たらこ・たらこ・たらこ たっぷりクリスマスBOX) (2006)

Singles
Tarako Tarako Tarako (たらこ・たらこ・たらこ) (2006)
Kurutto Mawatte Ikkaiten/Dancing Sister (くるっと・まわって・いっかいてん／ダンシング・シスター) (2007)
Hottottotto na Mainichi (ほっとっとっとな まいにち) (2007)
Tamagotchi (たまごっち) (2007)
Tamagotchi Happy Version (たまごっち　ハッピーヴァージョン) (2008)

TV appearances
愛のエプロン (Ai no EPURON; Love's Apron) March 7, 2007
うたばん (Utaban; Popular Songs) June 14, 2007
踊る踊る!さんま御殿お笑い怪獣大行進SP(Odoru Odoru! Sanma Goten Owarai Kaijū Daikōshin SP; Dance Dance! Palace of Big Funny Monster Parades SP) November 28, 2006
行列のできる法律相談所 (Gyōretsu no Dekiru Hōritsusōdantokoro; Line to the Law Center) December 10, 2006
くりぃむしちゅーのたりらリでイキます!! ('Kurī Mushichū no Tarirari de IKImasu!!') January 25, 2007
第35回記念FNS歌謡祭2006 (Dai 35-kai Kinen FNS Kayōsai; FNS 35th Anniversary Song Festival 2006) December 6, 2006
第48回日本レコード大賞 (Dai 48-kai NihonREKŌDOtaishō; 48th Annual Japan Record Awards) December 30, 2006
みんなで!さんすう99隊 (Minna de! Sansū 99:-dai; Together! Arithmic Squadron 99) January 22, 2007 (As singers)
Song download was only available on the website "DOGATCH" from 1/29/2007-3/31/2007
めざましどようび (Mezamashi Doyōbi; Saturday Alarm Clock)
September 10, 2006 ("OH!WAKU 50"コーナー (OH! WAKU 50 corner)
April 7, 2007 (ダンシング・シスター [Dancing Sister] *voices in a song*. Sponsored by the Nickelodeon Kid's Choice Awards; The duo was unable to appear at the KCA, due to Haruka's passport expiring.)
June 2, 2007 (エンタのタマテ箱 (ENTA no TAMATE Hako; The Enterprises' Tamate Case) and エンタ　ガラ×2　ポン！(ENTA GARAx2 PON; Gala Enterprise x2 Bong) corners
June 30, 2007 (Last appearance of Haruka in Kigurumi)
森田一義アワー 笑っていいとも! (Morita Kazuyoshi AWĀ Waratte Ītomo!; The Kazuyoshi Morita Hour with a Good Laugh!) September 18, 2006 (チビッコ一芸広場 [CHIBIKKŌ Gē Hirobi; Young Child Art Plaza] Corner)
ケロロ軍曹 (KERORO Gunsō; Sergeant Keroro) 4/7/2007-7/7/2007 (Ending Song)
ズームイン!!SUPER ズームSUPERステージ (ZŪMUIN!! SUPER ZŪMU SUPER SUTĒJI; Zoom In! Super Zoom Super Stage!) October 8, 2006
ポンキッキ (PONKIKKI) As singers for the song "Kyō wa MedeTAI (Today is a Happy Day)" from January 2007-March 30, 2007
ミュージックステーション (MYŪJIKKU SUTĒSHON; Music Station) September 8, 2006; October 20, 2006; December 22, 2006; January 12, 2007
December 22, 2006 - Became the youngest performers on "Super Music Station Live"
On New Year's Eve 2006, this show broadcast a 2-hour long broadcast of Kigurumi live.
HEY! HEY! HEY! MUSIC CHAMP- November 7, 2006

References

External links
 Official Website

Japanese pop music groups
Victor Entertainment artists